Aleksander Melgalvis Andreassen (born 10 August 1989) is a Norwegian footballer who plays for HamKam.

References

1989 births
Living people
Norwegian footballers
Eliteserien players
Norwegian First Division players
Kongsvinger IL Toppfotball players
Strømmen IF players
Lillestrøm SK players
Hamarkameratene players
Association football defenders
Sportspeople from Hamar
Norwegian people of Latvian descent